Brandon Dorman is an American illustrator of children's books, including novels and picture books. His most well-known work is the #1 New York Times bestselling picture book, The Wizard, written by Jack Prelutsky. He also illustrated all five books of Brandon Mull's New York Times bestselling Fablehaven series.

Published works

As author and illustrator
Pirates of the Sea!
Santa's Stowaway
Hoolie and the Hooligans: The Alien That Ate My Socks
Series
Axel the Truck I Can Read! series (published by HarperCollins)
Axel the Truck: Rocky Road
Axel the Truck: Field Trip
Axel the Truck: Speed Track
Axel the Truck: Beach Race

As illustrator only
Giant Dance Party, by Betsy Bird
The Curvy Tree, by Chris Colfer
In the Garden, by Caralyn Buehner
Snowman Magic, by Katherine Tegen
The Christmas Sweater, by Glenn Beck
The Snow Angel, by Glenn Beck
The Story of the Jack O'Lantern, by Katherine Tegen
Halloween Night, by Marjorie Dennis Murray
Falcon Quinn and the Black Mirror, by Jennifer Finney Boylan
Be Glad Your Nose is on Your Face, by Jack Prelutsky
The Wizard, by Jack Prelutsky
Snow Angels, by Angel Randall
The Slippery Map, by N. E. Bode
A Tale of Magic, by Chris Colfer
A Tale of Witchcraft, by Chris Colfer

Series
The Wednesday Tales series by Jon Berkeley
Book 1: The Palace of Laughter
Book 2: The Tiger's Egg
Book 3: The Lightning Key
The Nightmare Academy series by Dean Lorey
Book 1: Monster Hunters / Charlie's Monsters
Book 2: Monster Madness / Monster Revenge
Book 3: Monster War
The Fablehaven series by Brandon Mull
Book 1: Fablehaven
Book 2: Rise of the Evening Star
Book 3: Grip of the Shadow Plague
Book 4: Secrets of the Dragon Sanctuary
Book 5: Keys to the Demon Prison
The Janitors series by Tyler Whitesides
Book 1: Janitors
Book 2: Secrets of the New Forest Academy
Book 3: Curse of the Broomstaff
Book 4: Strike of the Sweepers
Book 5: Heroes of the Dustbin
The Land of Stories series by Chris Colfer
Book 1: The Wishing Spell
Book 2: Enchantrees Returns
Book 3: A Grimm Warning
Book 4: Beyond the Kingdoms
Book 5: An Author's Odyssey
Book 6: Worlds Collide
Goosebumps series by R.L. Stine

References

http://www.tylerwhitesides.com/books.html

Year of birth missing (living people)
Living people
American children's writers
American children's book illustrators